"My Life" is the second single by hip hop group Slaughterhouse from their album Welcome to: Our House. The song features artist Cee Lo Green and production by Streetrunner and Sarom. The song samples Corona's song "The Rhythm of The Night". It was available to purchase on iTunes on May 15, 2012.

Music video
A music video for the song was released on June 20, 2012 under VEVO on YouTube. It features a cameo appearance by rapper Eminem.

Track listing
Digital single

Notes
 signifies a co-producer.

Release history

Charts

References 

2012 singles
Slaughterhouse (group) songs
Songs written by Joe Budden
CeeLo Green songs
Songs written by CeeLo Green
Songs written by Royce da 5'9"
2012 songs
Songs written by Joell Ortiz
Songs written by Giorgio Spagna